On 14 May 2011, during the 2011–2012 Syrian uprising, the Syrian military began an operation in the Syrian town of Talkalakh. The government said it was targeting terrorist groups, while the Syrian opposition called it a crackdown against pro-democracy protesters.

The operation

On 15 May, the Syrian military entered the town of Talkalakh, on the border with Lebanon. There followed reports that the military was massacring members of the Syrian opposition. The reports were mostly from civilians fleeing over the Kabir River into Lebanon to escape the violence.

By 19 May, the military finished its operation and started to withdraw from Talkalakh.

See also

References

External links
We Live as in War, Human Rights Watch, 11 November 2011
By All Means Necessary!, Human Rights Watch, 16 December 2011

Talkalakh
Talkalakh Siege
Talkalakh Siege
Military operations of the Syrian civil war involving the Syrian government
May 2011 events in Syria